Yavetz is a Jewish surname. Notable people with the surname include:

 Ze'ev Yavetz (1847–1924), Polish-Jewish historian, teacher and Hebrew linguist
 Zvi Yavetz (1925–2013), Israeli historian

See also

 Javits (disambiguation)
 Javet (surname)